Manuel Roman (born January 10, 1988) is a Mexican professional boxer from Paramount, California. As of early 2015 he had 17 wins, 3 losses, and 3 draws. Roman currently fights in the super bantamweight division. On September 13, 2014, Roman lost to Leo Santa Cruz in the WBC super bantamweight championship of the world by TKO in the second round. He was scheduled to face Diego De La Hoya on February 27, 2015.

References

External links
 

Mexican male boxers
1988 births
Living people
People from Paramount, California
Super-bantamweight boxers